Fernando Marcelo Campagnolo (born 29 January 1974) is a retired Brazilian footballer who played mostly in Portugal for ten years as a defender mainly for Naval for eight years where he is currently one of the all-time appearance leaders. He was born in Piracicaba.

Career
He started his career off with his local club XV de Piracicaba in which he was there for seven years. In 1999, he moved to Portugal to Naval in which he had his most successful period in which his eight years at the club he was always in the last team and became one of the most influential players to have ever played for the club with over 200 appearances for Naval. In 2007, he moved to Liga de Honra club Beira-Mar in which he played 38 times and scored one goal and in 2009 he retired from football.

References

1974 births
Living people
Brazilian footballers
Esporte Clube XV de Novembro (Piracicaba) players
Associação Naval 1º de Maio players
S.C. Beira-Mar players
Brazilian expatriate footballers
Expatriate footballers in Portugal
Association football defenders
People from Piracicaba
Footballers from São Paulo (state)